Jiandi Dao (湔氐道) was a prefecture of ancient China located around today's Songpan region, in the east of Qingzang Plateau and northwest part of Sichuan province.

Jiandi Dao was founded by Qin (秦) after it conquered Shu (蜀) in BC 316. Han Dynasty reestablished Jiandi Dao in the 6th year of Yuanding (元鼎六年, AD 111). Jiandi Dao was changed to Jiandi County and became a constitute part of Wenshan Jun (汶山郡) in Jin Dynasty.

Di (氐) is an ancient large ethnic group lived in west China which is sometimes considered to be part of Qiang, called Diqiang. Dao (道) in Qin and Han Dynasty is a kind of administrative unit where mainly settled by primitive tribes.

History of Sichuan
Ngawa Tibetan and Qiang Autonomous Prefecture